Margaretatop is a mountain in eastern Greenland. Administratively it is part of the Northeast Greenland National Park.

History
At the time of Lauge Koch's 1949–51 expeditions this summit was named after Margareta Hediger by American geologist John Haller, a Fellow of the Geological Society of America.

The peak is marked as "Margaretatopp" and "Margarita Spids" in some maps. Margaretasø is a small lake in neighboring Rendal at  where the reflection of the mountain can be seen on its surface. This lake was named by John Haller after the same person.

Geography
Margaretatop is the highest point of Andrée Land.

This mountain is marked as a  peak in the Defense Mapping Agency Greenland Navigation charts.

See also
List of mountains in Greenland

References

External links
Greenland Pilot – Danish Geodata Agency

Margaretatop